Praproče pri Grosupljem (in older sources also Prapreče) is a small settlement east of Grosuplje in central Slovenia. The area is part of the historical region of Lower Carniola. The Municipality of Grosuplje is now included in the Central Slovenia Statistical Region.

History

The Slovene-American author and translator Louis Adamic was born in the settlement in 1898. Until 1998, Praproče pri Grosupljem was a hamlet of Spodnje Blato.

Notable people
Notable people that were born or lived in Praproče pri Grosupljem include:
 Louis Adamic (1898–1951), Slovene-American author and translator
 France Adamič (1911–2004), technical writer and orchard specialist
 Countess Antonie Cäcilia Philomena Ravenegg (née Lichtenberg, 1841–1929), wife of Emil Rotschütz and author of Die erprobte Honig-Köchin
 Emil Rotschütz (a.k.a. Ravenegg, Rožič; 1836–1906), apiculture specialist

References

External links

Praproče pri Grosupljem on Geopedia

Populated places in the Municipality of Grosuplje